Alistair Edmunds Blair MBE (16 November 1904 – 20 November 1984) was an English cricketer of Ceylonese descent. He was born in British Ceylon and was educated at Radley College in England.

Blair played his only Minor Counties Championship match for Devon against Dorset in 1922. Later, in January 1927 he made his first-class debut for the Europeans (Ceylon) against the touring Marylebone Cricket Club (MCC). The following month he played his only first-class match for the Up-Country XI against the same opposition and days later he represented Ceylon against the MCC once more. In his 3 first-class matches, Blair scored 190 runs at a batting average of 47.50, with a single half century high score of 95*.

Blair later served in World War II where he held the rank of lieutenant in the Black Watch.  In 1943, he earnt a non-combatant gallantry award and was awarded with an MBE.  The award was announced in The London Gazette on 9 July 1943. He died in Lympstone, Devon on 20 November 1984.

References

External links
Alistair Blair at Cricinfo
Alistair Blair at CricketArchive

1904 births
1984 deaths
People from British Ceylon
People educated at Radley College
English cricketers
Devon cricketers
British Army personnel of World War II
Black Watch officers
Members of the Order of the British Empire
English people of Sri Lankan descent
Europeans (Ceylon) cricketers
Up-Country XI cricketers
British people in British Ceylon